The 2013 World Military Cup take part in Baku, capital of Azerbaijan. The Tournament is also known as CISM World Football Trophy. It's the first edition of the new format in additional to the Military World Championship.

Group stage

Group A

Group B

Group C

Group D

Knockout stage

Quarterfinals

Semifinals

Third place match

The Final

Winner

Awards
 Top scorer:  Hammadi Ahmad (9 goals)
 Best player:  Abdulaziz Al-Muqbali
 Best goalkeeper:  Aqil Mammadov
 Fair game footballer:  Nodar Mammadov
 Fair play team:

References

External links
The official site of the tournament
CISM World Football Trophy
Results & Fixture
2013 World Men's Military Cup Draw
2013 World Men's Military Cup Matches

2013
2013 World Military Championship
2013
Mili